Oh My Dog is a 2022 Indian Tamil-language children's comedy drama film written and directed by debutant Sarov Shanmugam. Produced by Suriya and Jyothika under the 2D Entertainment banner, the film stars Arun Vijay and his son Arnav Vijay in his debut with Vinay Rai, Mahima Nambiar and  Vijayakumar in the supporting roles. The film's music and score is composed by Nivas K. Prasanna, with cinematography handled by Gopinath and editing done by Meghanathan. The film was released on the digital streaming platform Amazon Prime Video on 21 April 2022.

Plot 
The story sets in Tamilnadu, where Arjun lives with his parents Shankar and Priya, as well as his paternal grandfather Shanmugam. Arjun takes a liking toward animals. Fernando Lee is the owner of many dogs and has won the International Dog Competition 6 years in a row. Fernando wants to have the best dogs so he could use them during competitions, so when his Siberian Husky gives birth to a blind puppy, he orders his henchmen to kill the puppy on the outskirts of the city and bury it. His henchmen fail to do so, as the puppy flees and successfully escapes from them. Fernando's henchmen lie to him stating they killed the puppy, however, they have the constant fear that Fernando will eventually find out.

Arjun's father Shankar struggles to pay the mortgage loan of their house. As a result, Shankar's father and Arjun's grandfather Shanmugam criticize him for paying for Arjun's school fees instead of their house fees. Arjun accidentally discovers the puppy and cleans the puppy himself. He begs his mother to keep the puppy, but his mother doesn't allow him and forces him home. That next morning, the puppy uses his scent to go to Arjun's bedside and wake up Arjun. Arjun, feeling pity for the puppy, decides to raise the puppy without his family's consent. For an entire week, he hides the puppy in his home. He takes the puppy to school although it is prohibited. His classmates adore the puppy, and Arjun names the puppy Simba (after The Lion King). Fernando's henchmen realize that Arjun has the puppy and try different techniques to take back and kill Simba, all but in vain. Eventually, the principal finds out with the help of PT Master Swaminathan, and Shankar is informed. Shankar is given the last warning. Shankar angrily throws away Simba and angrily confronts Arjun about it. Arjun develops fever due to Simba leaving. Arjun's mother Priya convinces Shankar to take back Simba, saying that during Simba's stay, Arjun was being well-behaved.

Shankar and Arjun go looking for Simba, but they are kicked out due to a bear roaming the area. A nightmare Arjun has where Simba is eaten by the bear causes him to leave the house himself at night and look for Simba. Shankar and Priya realize Arjun is missing and go looking for him. They luckily find him with Simba. The family happily adopts Simba, however, Shanmugam dislikes the presence of Simba. Arjun learns that a local hospital could cure Simba's blindness for 2 lakhs. He and his classmates start raising money for his surgery. Although they are unsuccessful, they learn about the International Dog Competition happening in Coimbatore offering a 2 lakh winning prize. Arjun signs into the competition with the help of his father. He wins third place for the first challenge. Simba and Arjun slowly start making their way to the finals.

Simba however gets successfully kidnapped by Fernando's henchmen but gets saved by Arjun. Fernando's henchmen chase after Arjun, in which, he takes refuge in his friend Ladoo's home. When the henchmen barge in, they are confronted by Ladoo's father, who is a police officer. They get imprisoned for 6 months. During those 6 months, Simba makes his way to the finals, as Simba grows, so does his intelligence. Arjun hears about a Russian Doctor in the area who's offering to do the surgery. Shankar goes believing it is free treatment but refuses when he realizes it costs money. The Russian Doctor kindly does the treatment for free, and Simba cures his blindness. This helps Simba get into the finals, and Fernando fears that he may have hard competition that year. Fernando goes to Shankar's house and offers to buy Simba for Shankar's mortgage loan to be paid. Shankar refuses but Shanmugam is angry with that decision. Shankar loses a lot of money shortly after and fears he could lose his house. He goes to Shanmugam defeated, feeling like he failed as a son. Shanmugam suggests that maybe selling Simba would've been a good idea.

Shanmugam experiences a heart attack in the middle of the night, only to be saved by Simba who warned the entire family. Shanmugam recovers but the remorseful Arjun explains that there is an entry fee for the final dog competition and Shankar can't pay due to his situation. Shanmugam has a change of heart and offers to pay using his Old Age Security. Fernando learns that Simba was blind-born and realizes it might have been his dog. He punishes his henchmen and learns that Simba had just got an eye surgery but this could be disrupted by flashing lights. Fernando causes the stage lights to malfunction and flash, this causes Simba to once again be blind. During the finals, the judges don't allow Simba in due to a policy of blind dogs being unable to participate. But with the help of Shankar and the audience, Simba is able to get into the game and set a new world record (winning the competition and breaking Fernando's record). Arjun accidentally eavesdrops and hears Fernando demanding the medal be given to him or else he would kill Simba. Arjun gives Fernando his dog as a result pleading not to kill it and asking the host to crown Fernando as the winner. Fernando realizes his mistake and exposes himself in front of the audience, giving the award and Simba back to Arjun, claiming Arjun is the true winner. Shanmugam expresses that Shankar is the greatest father anyone could have. The family pays the mortgage loans as well as the school fees. The film ends with that the family lives happily ever after.

Cast

Soundtrack 
The film’s music was composed by Nivas K. Prasanna.

Release 
Oh My Dog was released directly on Amazon prime video on 21 April 2022 as a part of 2D Entertainment's four-film deal with the streaming service.

Reception 
Oh My Dog was released directly on Amazon prime video on 21 April 2022.Logesh Balachandran critic from Times of india Noted that " Oh My Dog! is not a painful watch. Kids might enjoy the film, but its universal theme could have been portrayed in a better way"and gave 2.5 stars out of 5 Star.Hindustan Times critic gave mixture of reviews and noted that "shanmugam debut movie is a warm and cute tale of a boy and his dog. Though not without a few flaws, it will appeal to kids and grown ups alike.".Manoj Kumar R critic from The Indian Express gave 3 stars out of 5 and noted that " This is not just about an abandoned puppy finding love. It is about a band of people, traditionally considered weak who stand up for themselves and stick it to the big guy."

References

External links 
 

2020s Tamil-language films
2022 directorial debut films
Amazon Prime Video original films
Films about dogs
Films about pets